This is a list of 154 species in Xorides, a genus of ichneumon wasps in the family Ichneumonidae.

Xorides species

 Xorides abaddon (Morley, 1913) c g
 Xorides aciculatus (Benoit, 1952) c g
 Xorides aculeatus Liu & Sheng, 1998 c g
 Xorides albimaculatus Sheng, 2000 c g
 Xorides albopictus (Cresson, 1870) c g b
 Xorides alpestris (Habermehl, 1903) c g
 Xorides amissiantennes Wang, 1997 c g
 Xorides annulator (Fabricius, 1804) c g
 Xorides annulatus (Gravenhorst, 1829) c g
 Xorides antennalis (Szepligeti, 1914) c
 Xorides anthracinus Gupta & Chandra, 1974 c g
 Xorides armidae Gauld, 1997 c g
 Xorides asperus Wang & Gupta, 1995 c g
 Xorides ater (Gravenhorst, 1829) c g
 Xorides atrox Townes, 1960 c g
 Xorides australiensis (Szepligeti, 1914) c
 Xorides austriacus (Clement, 1938) c g
 Xorides berlandi Clement, 1938 c g
 Xorides boharti Townes, 1960 c g
 Xorides brachylabis (Kriechbaumer, 1889) c g
 Xorides brookei (Cameron, 1903) c g
 Xorides caerulescens (Morley, 1913) c g
 Xorides caeruleus (Cameron, 1905) c g
 Xorides calidus (Provancher, 1886) c g b
 Xorides californicus (Cresson, 1879) c g
 Xorides carinifrons Baltazar, 1961 c g
 Xorides centromaculatus Cushman, 1933 c g
 Xorides cerbonei Porter, 1978 c g
 Xorides chalybeator (Smith, 1862) c g
 Xorides cincticornis (Cresson, 1865) c g b
 Xorides citrimaculatus Wang & Gupta, 1995 c g
 Xorides confusus Baltazar, 1961 c g
 Xorides corcyrensis (Kriechbaumer, 1894) c g
 Xorides crassitibialis (Uchida, 1932) c
 Xorides crudelis (Turner, 1919) c g
 Xorides csikii Clement, 1938 c g
 Xorides deplanatus Sheng, 2006 c g
 Xorides depressus (Holmgren, 1860) c g
 Xorides eastoni (Rohwer, 1913) c g
 Xorides elizabethae (Bingham, 1898) c g
 Xorides ephialtoides (Kriechbaumer, 1882) c g
 Xorides erigentis Wang & Gupta, 1995 c g
 Xorides erythrothorax (Turner, 1919) c g
 Xorides euthrix Porter, 1975 c g
 Xorides exmacularis Wang & Gupta, 1995 c g
 Xorides exquisitus (Tosquinet, 1903) c g
 Xorides filiformis (Gravenhorst, 1829) c g
 Xorides flavopictus Baltazar, 1961 c g
 Xorides flavotibialis Hilszczanski, 2000 c g
 Xorides formosanus (Sonan, 1936) c
 Xorides formosulus (Kokujev, 1912) c g
 Xorides fracticornis (Smith, 1860) c g
 Xorides frigidus (Cresson, 1870) c g
 Xorides fulgidipennis (Smith, 1858) c g
 Xorides fuligator (Thunberg, 1822) c g
 Xorides funiuensis Sheng, 2000 c g
 Xorides furcatus Liu & Sheng, 1998 c g
 Xorides giganticus Baltazar, 1961 c g
 Xorides gloriosus (Szepligeti, 1914) c g
 Xorides gracilicornis (Gravenhorst, 1829) c g
 Xorides gravenhorstii (Curtis, 1831) c g
 Xorides harringtoni Rohwer, 1920 c g
 Xorides hedwigi Clement, 1938 c g
 Xorides hiatus Wang & Gupta, 1995 c g
 Xorides hingganensis Wang & Gupta, 1995 c g
 Xorides hirtus Liu & Sheng, 1998 c g
 Xorides hulstaerti (Benoit, 1952) c g
 Xorides humeralis (Say, 1829) c g b
 Xorides humos Gauld, 1997 c g
 Xorides idunae Gauld, 1997 c g
 Xorides ilignus Hilszczanski, 2000 c g
 Xorides immaculatus Cushman, 1933 c g
 Xorides indicatorius (Latreille, 1806) c g
 Xorides indicus Gupta & Chandra, 1972 c g
 Xorides insularis (Cresson, 1879) c
 Xorides investigator (Smith, 1874) c g
 Xorides iodes Baltazar, 1961 c g
 Xorides irrigator (Fabricius, 1793) c g
 Xorides iwatensis (Uchida, 1928) c g
 Xorides jakovlevi (Kokujev, 1903) c g
 Xorides jezoensis (Matsumura, 1912) c
 Xorides jiyuanensis Sheng, 2004 c g
 Xorides karnaticus Gupta & Chandra, 1977 c g
 Xorides konduensis (Benoit, 1952) c g
 Xorides konumensis (Uchida, 1928) c g
 Xorides lambei (Handlirsch, 1911) c g
 Xorides lissopunctus Gupta & Chandra, 1972 c g
 Xorides longicaudus Sheng & Wen, 2008 c g
 Xorides maculatus (Benoit, 1952) c g
 Xorides maculiceps (Cameron, 1906) c g
 Xorides maculipennis (Smith, 1859) c
 Xorides madronensis Ruiz-Cancino & Kasparyan, 2000 c g
 Xorides magnificus (Mocsary, 1905) c g
 Xorides maudae (Davis, 1895) c g
 Xorides mayumbensis (Benoit, 1952) c g
 Xorides medius Townes, 1960 c g
 Xorides mindanensis Baltazar, 1961 c g
 Xorides minimus Gupta & Chandra, 1974 c g
 Xorides minutus Clement, 1938 c g
 Xorides mirabilis (Seyrig, 1932) c g
 Xorides nasensis Uchida, 1956 c g
 Xorides neoclyti (Rohwer, 1915) c g
 Xorides niger (Pfeffer, 1913) c g
 Xorides nigricaeruleus Wang & Gupta, 1995 c g
 Xorides nigristomus Gupta & Chandra, 1974 c g
 Xorides ornatus (Tosquinet, 1903) c
 Xorides peniculus Townes, 1960 c g
 Xorides philippinensis Baltazar, 1961 c g
 Xorides pictus Townes, 1960 c g
 Xorides pissodius Sheng & Wen, 2008 c g
 Xorides planus Townes, 1960 c g
 Xorides plumicornis (Smith, 1877) c g
 Xorides praecatorius (Fabricius, 1793) c g
 Xorides praestans (Tosquinet, 1896) c g
 Xorides propinquus (Tschek, 1869) c g
 Xorides propodeum (Cushman, 1933) c g
 Xorides rileyi (Ashmead, 1890) c g
 Xorides rubrator Khalaim & Ruiz-Cancino, 2007 c g
 Xorides rudis Townes, 1960 c g
 Xorides ruficeps (Cameron, 1903) c g
 Xorides rufipes (Gravenhorst, 1829) c g
 Xorides rufipleuralis (Cushman, 1933) c g
 Xorides rufomaculatus (Cameron, 1905) c
 Xorides rusticus (Desvignes, 1856) c g
 Xorides sapporensis (Uchida, 1928) c g
 Xorides scaber (Gravenhorst, 1829) c g
 Xorides secos Gauld, 1997 c g
 Xorides sejugatus (Brues, 1910) c g
 Xorides semirufus Townes, 1960 c g
 Xorides sepulchralis (Holmgren, 1860) c g
 Xorides serratitibia (Enderlein, 1914) c g
 Xorides shevyrevi (Meyer, 1926) c g
 Xorides similis (Benoit, 1952) c g
 Xorides sinoxyli Sedivy, 1996 c g
 Xorides smithi (Schmiedeknecht, 1907) c g
 Xorides spectabilis (Tosquinet, 1903) c g
 Xorides splendens (Brues, 1918) c g
 Xorides stepposus Kasparyan, 1981 c g
 Xorides stigmapterus (Say, 1824) c g b
 Xorides strandi (Clement, 1938) c g
 Xorides syrinx Gauld, 1997 c g
 Xorides tamora Gauld, 1997 c g
 Xorides tarsalis (Szepligeti, 1914) c
 Xorides thanatos Gauld, 1997 c g
 Xorides tornatus (Schiodte, 1839) c g
 Xorides townesi Baltazar, 1961 c g
 Xorides tumidus Sheng & Wen, 2008 c g
 Xorides tuqiangensis Sheng, 1998 c g
 Xorides vitalisi (Turner, 1919) c
 Xorides vitiosus (Turner, 1919) c g
 Xorides weii Sheng, 2002 c g
 Xorides wenzeli Gauld, 1997 c g
 Xorides xanthisma Porter, 1975 c g
 Xorides yamai Gauld, 1997 c g

Data sources: i = ITIS, c = Catalogue of Life, g = GBIF, b = Bugguide.net

References

Xorides